

The Koonung Creek Trail is a shared use path for cyclists and pedestrians, which follows Koonung Creek in the eastern suburbs of Melbourne, Victoria, Australia. The trail also follows the course of the Eastern Freeway as it too, follows the course of the Koonung Creek, and has good connections to on-road paths.

Following the path
The path is easy to follow as it travels parallel to the Eastern Freeway.  west of Middleborough Road the trail is located on the south side of the freeway. East of that point it runs along the north side of the freeway.

Near the Bushy Creek Trail turnoff is a small wetland area with purple swamphens and the occasional little pied cormorant. Koonung Creek Reserve also contains a small wetland which contains some native wildlife.

Connections
Yarra River Trail in the west. Intersects the Bushy Creek Trail in the middle.

Leaving the trail at Middleborough Rd and travelling north 1.9 km by road, leads to the Ruffey Creek Trail near George St. Leaving the trail at Middleborough Rd and travelling south  by road, leads to the Bushy Creek Trail via Springfield Rd.

References 

Bike rides around Melbourne 3rd edition, 2009, Julia Blunden, Open Spaces Publishing, 

Bike paths in Melbourne